Al Faisal Al Zubair (born 17 April 1998) is an Omani racing driver.

Career 
In 2015, Al-Faisal Al-Zubair competed in the international field of the BRDC British Formula 4 racing, where he collected one podium finish and was placed fourth overall in the Autumn Trophy.

He graduated to the BRDC British Formula 3 Championship with Fortec Motorsports in 2016. He then embarked upon a winter racing programme in 2016-2017 Porsche GT3 Cup Challenge Middle East for the first time. He finished fifth in the overall standings and clinched Rookie and Silver category victories.

At the start of 2017, he teamed up with Walter Lechner Racing to take part in the Porsche Mobil 1 Super Cup that runs in conjunction with the FIA Formula One World Championship. He became champion in the 2017-2018 Porsche Cup Challenge Middle East in only his second season in the series.

In 2018-2019, Al-Faisal Al-Zubair successfully defended his championship by winning the Porsche BWT GT3 Cup Challenge Middle East series, the first racing driver to win consecutive championships in its 10-year history.

Racing record

Career summary 

† Not eligible for points.

Complete GT World Challenge Europe results

GT World Challenge Europe Endurance Cup 
(Races in bold indicate pole position) (Races in italics indicate fastest lap)

References

External links

 Al Faisal Al Zubair at RedBull.com

1998 births
Living people
Omani racing drivers
Porsche Supercup drivers
Audi Sport TT Cup drivers
People from Muscat, Oman
24H Series drivers
British GT Championship drivers
BRDC British Formula 3 Championship drivers
Fortec Motorsport drivers
Walter Lechner Racing drivers
International GT Open drivers
Mercedes-AMG Motorsport drivers
Porsche Carrera Cup Germany drivers
Asian Le Mans Series drivers